Aghcheh Qeshlaq, also rendered as Aqcheh Qeshlaq, may refer to various places in Iran:
 Aghcheh Qeshlaq, Ardabil
 Aghcheh Qeshlaq-e Olya, Ardabil
 Aghcheh Qeshlaq-e Sofla, Ardabil Province
 Aghcheh Qeshlaq, East Azerbaijan
 Aghcheh Qeshlaq, alternate name of Agh Qeshlaq, Meyaneh, East Azerbaijan Province
 Aghcheh Qeshlaq, Qazvin
 Aghcheh Qeshlaq, West Azerbaijan